Hana Horáková ( Machová, ; born 11 September 1979 in Bruntál) is a basketball player from the Czech Republic who plays for BK Brno. She was a member of the national team that won the European title in 2005 by defeating Russia in the final. Playing as a guard she also competed for her native country at the 2004 Summer Olympics in Athens, Greece, the 2008 Summer Olympics in Beijing and the 2012 Summer Olympics in London, finishing in fifth place in 2004 and in seventh place at the other two Olympics.

She won EuroLeague Women 2005-06 with Gambrinus Brno and played 12 ppg, 4.5 rpg and 3 apg averages in EuroLeague Women 2009–10. She also won the Turkish Women's Basketball League 2011 with Fenerbahçe Istanbul.

In 2010, she led the Czech Republic to a surprise 2nd-place finish in the FIBA World Championship for Women and was named the tournament MVP.

References

External links
 
 
 Hana Machová at EurobasketWomen2005.com (archived)
 
 
 
 

1979 births
Living people
Basketball players at the 2004 Summer Olympics
Basketball players at the 2008 Summer Olympics
Basketball players at the 2012 Summer Olympics
Czech women's basketball players
Czech expatriate basketball people in Turkey
Fenerbahçe women's basketball players
Olympic basketball players of the Czech Republic
People from Bruntál
Point guards
Shooting guards
FIBA Hall of Fame inductees
Sportspeople from the Moravian-Silesian Region